Bienvenu Mbida is a Congolese judoka. He competed in the men's half-lightweight event at the 1984 Summer Olympics.

References

Year of birth missing (living people)
Living people
Republic of the Congo male judoka
Olympic judoka of the Republic of the Congo
Judoka at the 1984 Summer Olympics
Place of birth missing (living people)